Allen Wier (born September 9, 1946; died December 4, 2021; pronounced "wire"), was an American writer and a professor. He was the Watkins Endowed Visiting Writer at Murray State University from 2016 until 2020; he is Professor Emeritus having taught at the University of Tennessee from 1994 until 2015, and the University of Alabama from 1980 to 1994. and Hollins College from 1975 to 1980 and Carnegie-Mellon University from 1974 to 1975. He taught in the University of New Orleans summer writing workshop in Edinburgh, Scotland in Summer of 2013. He was visiting writer at the University of Texas in 1983 and at Florida International University 1984-1985.

Biography 
Wier was born on September 9, 1946 in San Antonio, Texas and spent parts of his childhood in Louisiana and Mexico. He attended Baylor University and received his BA degree (1968); Louisiana State University and received his MA degree (1971); and Bowling Green University received his MFA degree (1974).

He taught at the University of Tennessee from 1994 until 2015, and the University of Alabama from 1980 to 1994. Additionally teaching at Longwood College, Carnegie-Mellon University, Hollins College, University of Texas, Florida International University, and Murray State University.

In 2003, Wier was inducted into the Fellowship of Southern Writers, along with Barry Hannah and Yusef Komunyakaa. He is widely published in anthologies and periodicals, including The New York Times, Ploughshares, and The Southern Review. Was formerly married to the poet Dara Wier. Then married artist Donnie Wier, with whom he became a step-father of two sons Heath and Mike, then had his first and only son, Wes.

Awards and honors
2021, awarded the Truman Capote Prize for Short Fiction
2008, awarded the 27th John Dos Passos Prize for Literature
2005, special mention for his short story "The Taste of Dirt" in the Pushcart Prize volume 2005
2003, inducted into the Fellowship of Southern Writers
1997, Robert Penn Warren Award for Fiction, Fellowship of Southern Writers
1990, Dobie-Paisano Fellowship, University of Texas and Texas Institute of Letters
1978, fiction fellowship, Breadloaf Conference
1978, short fiction award, Texas Institute of Letters Award
1979, fiction award, Guggenheim Fellow, John Simon Guggenheim Memorial Foundation
1974–1975, National Endowment for the Arts Fellowship

 Bibliography 

Books

Wier, Allen (2017). Late Night, Early Morning:'' Stories, University of Tennessee Press.

Other publications

References

External links

Allen Wier at the University of Tennessee
Allen Wier at the Fellowship of Southern Writers

20th-century American novelists
21st-century American novelists
American male novelists
Longwood University faculty
People from Knoxville, Tennessee
1946 births
People from San Antonio
Living people
American male short story writers
20th-century American short story writers
21st-century American short story writers
20th-century American male writers
21st-century American male writers
Novelists from Virginia